Stephen Park is an American comedian and actor. He is best known for being a cast member of the sketch comedy television series In Living Color during the 1991–1992 season. He is also known for the film roles of Sonny in Do the Right Thing (1989), Detective Brian in Falling Down (1993), Mike Yanagita in Fargo (1996), and Lt. Nescaffier in The French Dispatch (2021).

Park's other acting work includes the role of Mike Sorayama in the Adult Swim animated television series The Venture Bros. and the role of Judge Pete in the critically acclaimed independent film Rocket Science (2007). Park has acted in two Coen brothers films, Fargo and A Serious Man (2009).

Early life and career
Park grew up in Vestal, New York. The son of Korean immigrants, Park began his entertainment career as a stand-up comedian before transitioning into acting. 

Park was a cast member on In Living Color. He has appeared in films such as Do the Right Thing (1989), Fargo (1996), A Serious Man (2009), Snowpiercer (2013), and The French Dispatch (2021).

Personal life
Park married Kelly Coffield, another former cast member of In Living Color, in 1999. They have a son, Owen, and a daughter, Eliza.

Advocacy

In 1997, Park wrote a mission statement in which he called for Hollywood to portray people of Asian descent in a less disparaging light. He wrote the statement after witnessing a racist incident while appearing in a guest role on the television series Friends. In his statement, Park wrote that "In movies and television, Asian characters, mostly men, are subjected to indignity and violence or are tokenized, while Asian women are exploited as objects of sexual desire. You rarely see Asian characters in leading roles that contain any significant power or influence".

Filmography

Film

Television

References

External links

American male actors of Korean descent
American male film actors
American male television actors
American male comedians
21st-century American comedians
Living people
Year of birth missing (living people)
People from Brooklyn
People from Vestal, New York